Perseus and the Gorgon is a sculptural group by French artist Laurent Marqueste composed of five statues made between 1875 and 1903.

The first plaster model was made in 1875, and a bronze statue made from it in 1877 (but the operation damaged the original plaster one). Marqueste had to make another plaster statue in 1887, which is now located in musée des Augustins. He then made a first marble in 1890 and second one in 1903.

White marble of 1890 
The white marble made in 1890 is now in the chapel of the Musée des Beaux-Arts de Lyon.

It was acquired by the French state in 1890 for 18000 francs and was stored at the Musée du Luxembourg (1890-1913) and the Dépôt des marbres (from 1931). Until 1999 it was stored at Villeurbanne. It was moved to the Musée d’Orsay in 1986 and then to its present home in 1999. It was restored in 2000.

Sources 
Musée d'Orsay: Notice d'Oeuvre

1890 sculptures
Marble sculptures
Sculptures of the Museum of Fine Arts of Lyon
Snakes in art